A blood substitute (also called artificial blood or blood surrogate) is a substance used to mimic and fulfill some functions of biological blood. It aims to provide an alternative to blood transfusion, which is transferring blood or blood-based products from one person into another. Thus far, there are no well-accepted oxygen-carrying blood substitutes, which is the typical objective of a red blood cell transfusion; however, there are widely available non-blood volume expanders for cases where only volume restoration is required. These are helping doctors and surgeons avoid the risks of disease transmission and immune suppression, address the chronic blood donor shortage, and address the concerns of Jehovah's Witnesses and others who have religious objections to receiving transfused blood.

The main categories of "oxygen-carrying" blood substitutes being pursued are hemoglobin-based oxygen carriers (HBOC) and perfluorocarbon emulsions. Oxygen therapeutics are in clinical trials in the U.S. and Europe, and Hemopure is available in South Africa.

History
After William Harvey discovered blood pathways in 1616, many people tried to use fluids such as beer, urine, milk, and non-human animal blood as blood substitute. Sir Christopher Wren suggested wine and opium as blood substitute.

At the beginning of the 20th century, the development of modern transfusion medicine initiated through the work of Landsteiner and co-authors opened the possibility to understanding the general principle of blood group serology.  Simultaneously, significant progress was made in the fields of heart and circulation physiology as well as in the understanding of the mechanism of oxygen transport and tissue oxygenation.

Restrictions in applied transfusion medicine, especially in disaster situations such as World War II, laid the grounds for accelerated research in the field of blood substitutes. Early attempts and optimism in developing blood substitutes were very quickly confronted with significant side effects, which could not be promptly eliminated due to the level of knowledge and technology available at that time. The emergence of HIV in the 1980s renewed impetus for development of infection-safe blood substitutes. Public concern about the safety of the blood supply was raised further by mad cow disease. The continuous decline of blood donation combined with the increased demand for blood transfusion (increased ageing of population, increased incidence of invasive diagnostic, chemotherapy and extensive surgical interventions, terror attacks, international military conflicts) and positive estimation of investors in biotechnology branch made for a positive environment for further development of blood substitutes.

Efforts to develop blood substitutes have been driven by a desire to replace blood transfusion in emergency situations, in places where infectious disease is endemic and the risk of contaminated blood products is high, where refrigeration to preserve blood may be lacking, and where it might not be possible or convenient to find blood type matches.

In 2023, DARPA announced funding twelve universities and labs for synthetic blood research. Human trials would be expected to 2028~2030.

Approaches
Efforts have focused on molecules that can carry oxygen, and most work has focused on recombinant hemoglobin, which normally carries oxygen, and perfluorocarbons (PFC), chemical compounds which can carry and release oxygen.

The first approved oxygen-carrying blood substitute was a perfluorocarbon-based product called Fluosol-DA-20, manufactured by Green Cross of Japan. It was approved by the Food and Drug Administration (FDA) in 1989. Because of limited success, complexity of use and side effects, it was withdrawn in 1994. However, Fluosol-DA remains the only oxygen therapeutic ever fully approved by the FDA.  As of 2017 no hemoglobin-based product had been approved.

Perfluorocarbon based

Perfluorochemicals are not water soluble and will not mix with blood, therefore emulsions must be made by dispersing small drops of PFC in water. This liquid is then mixed with antibiotics, vitamins, nutrients and salts, producing a mixture that contains about 80 different components, and performs many of the vital functions of natural blood. PFC particles are about  the size of the diameter of a red blood cell (RBC). This small size can enable PFC particles to traverse capillaries through which no RBCs are flowing. In theory this can benefit damaged, blood-starved tissue, which conventional red cells cannot reach. PFC solutions can carry oxygen so well that mammals, including humans, can survive breathing liquid PFC solution, called liquid breathing.

Perfluorocarbon-based blood substitutes are completely man-made; this provides advantages over blood substitutes that rely on modified hemoglobin, such as unlimited manufacturing capabilities, ability to be heat-sterilized, and PFCs' efficient oxygen delivery and carbon dioxide removal. PFCs in solution act as an intravascular oxygen carrier to temporarily augment oxygen delivery to tissues. PFCs are removed from the bloodstream within 48 hours by the body's normal clearance procedure for particles in the blood – exhalation. PFC particles in solution can carry several times more oxygen per cubic centimeter (cc) than blood, while being 40 to 50 times smaller than hemoglobin.

Fluosol was made mostly of perfluorodecalin or perfluorotributylamine suspended in an albumin emulsion. It was developed in Japan and first tested in the United States in November 1979. In order to "load" sufficient amounts of oxygen into it, people who had been given it had to breathe pure oxygen by mask or in a hyperbaric chamber. It was approved by the FDA in 1989, and was approved in eight other countries. Its use was associated with a reduction in ischemic complications and with an increase in pulmonary edema and congestive heart failure.  Due to difficulty with the emulsion storage of Fluosol use (frozen storage and rewarming), its popularity declined and its production ended in 1994.

Oxygent was a second-generation, lecithin-stabilized emulsion of a PFC that was under development by Alliance Pharmaceuticals.   In 2002 a Phase III study was halted early due an increase in incidences of strokes in the study arm.

Haemoglobin based
Haemoglobin is the main component of red blood cells, comprising about 33% of the cell mass. Haemoglobin-based products are called haemoglobin-based oxygen carriers (HBOCs).

Unmodified cell-free haemoglobin is not useful as a blood substitute because its oxygen affinity is too high for effective tissue oxygenation, the half-life within the intravascular space that is too short to be clinically useful, it has a tendency to undergo dissociation in dimers with resultant kidney damage and toxicity, and because free haemoglobin tends to take up nitric oxide, causing vasoconstriction.

Efforts to overcome this toxicity have included making genetically engineered versions, cross-linking, polymerization, and encapsulation.

HemAssist, a diaspirin cross-linked haemoglobin (DCLHb) was developed by Baxter Healthcare; it was the most widely studied of the haemoglobin-based blood substitutes, used in more than a dozen animal and clinical studies.   It reached Phase III clinical trials, in which it failed due to increased mortality in the trial arm, mostly due to severe vasoconstriction complications.   The results were published in 1999.

Hemolink (Hemosol Inc., Mississauga, Canada) was a haemoglobin solution that contained cross-linked an o-rafinose polymerised human haemoglobin. Hemosol struggled after Phase II trials were halted in 2003 on safety concerns and declared bankruptcy in 2005.

Hemopure was developed by Biopure Corp and was a chemically stabilized, cross-linked bovine (cow) haemoglobin in a salt solution intended for human use; the company developed the same product under the trade name Oxyglobin for veterinary use in dogs.  Oxyglobin was approved in the US and Europe and was introduced to veterinary clinics and hospitals in March 1998. Hemopure was approved in South Africa and Russia. Biopure filed for bankruptcy protection in 2009. Its assets were subsequently purchased by HbO2 Therapeutics in 2014.

PolyHeme was developed over 20 years by Northfield Laboratories and began as a military project following the Vietnam War. It is human haemoglobin, extracted from red blood cells, then polymerized, then incorporated into an electrolyte solution. In April 2009, the FDA rejected Northfield's Biologic License Application and in June 2009, Northfield filed for bankruptcy.

Dextran-Haemoglobin was developed by Dextro-Sang Corp as a veterinary product, and was a conjugate of the polymer dextran with human haemoglobin.

Hemotech was developed by HemoBiotech and was a chemically modified haemoglobin.

Somatogen developed a genetically engineered and crosslinked tetramer it called Optro. It failed in a phase II trial that was published in 2014 and development was halted.

A pyridoxylated Hb conjugated with polyoxyethylene was created by scientists at Ajinomoto and eventually developed by Apex Biosciences, a subsidiary of Curacyte AG; it was called "PHP" and failed in a Phase III trial published in 2014, due to increased mortality in the control arm, which led to Curacyte shutting down.

Similarly, Hemospan was developed by Sangart, and was a pegylated haemoglobin provided in a powdered form. While early trials were promising Sangart ran out of funding and closed down.

Stem cells
Stem cells offer a possible means of producing transfusable blood. A study performed by Giarratana et al. describes a large-scale ex-vivo production of mature human blood cells using hematopoietic stem cells. The cultured cells possessed the same haemoglobin content and morphology as native red blood cells. The authors contend that the cells had a near-normal lifespan, when compared to natural red blood cells.

Scientists from the experimental arm of the United States Department of Defense began creating artificial blood for use in remote areas and transfuse blood to wounded soldiers more quickly in 2010. The blood is made from the hematopoietic stem cells removed from the umbilical cord between human mother and newborn using a method called blood pharming. Pharming has been used in the past on animals and plants to create medical substances in large quantities. Each cord can produce approximately 20 units of blood. The blood is being produced for the Defense Advanced Research Projects Agency by Arteriocyte. The Food and Drug Administration has examined and approved the safety of this blood from previously submitted O-negative blood. Using this particular artificial blood will reduce the costs per unit of blood from $5,000 to equal or less than $1,000. This blood will also serve as a blood donor to all common blood types.

See also
 Artificial Cells, Blood Substitutes, and Biotechnology
 Blood plasma substitute (disambiguation)
 Blood transfusion
 Bloodless surgery
 Erythromer
 Induced blood stem cells
 Respirocyte
 Theatrical blood

References

External links 
 How Artificial Blood Works at HowStuffWorks

 
Synthetic biology
Transfusion medicine